Getinge is a global medical technology company, founded in Sweden in 1904. The firm provides equipment and systems within healthcare and life sciences. The company was formerly organised in three business areas: Infection Control (trading as Getinge), Extended Care (ArjoHuntleigh) and Medical Systems (Maquet, the world's largest maker of surgical tables), but announced it would become a single brand company, operating under the brand Getinge, on 20 March 2017.

In 1989, it was acquired by Rune Andersson and Carl Bennet. Getinge’s stocks have been noted on the Stockholm stock exchange since 1993 and have been part of the OMXS30 Index since July 2009.

The company's president and CEO is Mattias Perjos. Johan Malmquist is the company's chairman. Getinge's shares have been listed on the OMX Nordic List in Stockholm since 1993 and have formed part of the OMXS30 index since July 2009. In 2011 Getinge acquired the US company Atrium Medical and in 2014 Pulsion Medical Systems.

References
 GETINGE, "Getinge 1904-2004 - the first hundred years", 2004 Almqvist & Wiksell,

External links

Manufacturing companies established in 1904
Manufacturing companies based in Gothenburg
Medical technology companies of Sweden
Multinational companies headquartered in Sweden
Swedish brands
Companies listed on Nasdaq Stockholm
Health care companies established in 1904
Swedish companies established in 1904